Brian Heffel (17 May 1944 – 11 January 2013) was a Canadian wrestler. He competed in two events at the 1968 Summer Olympics.

References

External links
 

1944 births
2013 deaths
Canadian male sport wrestlers
Olympic wrestlers of Canada
Wrestlers at the 1968 Summer Olympics
Place of birth missing